Hubert Thorn (21 April 1909 – 20 May 1982) was an English cricketer. He played one match for Essex in 1928.

References

External links

1909 births
1982 deaths
English cricketers
Essex cricketers
People from Tiptree